The St. Alphonsus' Hospital Nurses' Home and Heating Plant/Laundry in Boise, Idaho, are two buildings designed by architects Tourtellotte and Hummel in 1920 and completed in 1921. Included are a 4-story, brick and sandstone residence for nurses and a 1-story, brick and sandstone heating plant which supplied not only the residence but St. Alphonsus Hospital (demolished) and St. Teresa's Academy (demolished). The site was added to the National Register of Historic Places in 1982.

The nursing staff at St. Alphonsus Hospital was affiliated with Sisters of the Holy Cross, and many nurses had taken vows of celibacy and poverty, hence a need for residential provisions.

Nurses' Home
The building included a reception room and parlor, library, lecture hall, swimming pool, gymnasium, two sun porches and three sleeping porches. A superintendent's apartment and 75 bedrooms, three with private bath, were constructed on the first through fourth floors. The basement included two dining rooms, a kitchen, and a pantry. The building accommodated 100 nurses and student nurses.

Both the residence and the heating plant were later acquired by the State of Idaho. The nurses' home was converted to office space for the Idaho Commission for the Blind and Visually Impaired, and the heating plant became a storage space.

See also
St. Alphonsus Liguori

References

External links
 
 Saint Alphonsus Health System

		
National Register of Historic Places in Ada County, Idaho
Infrastructure completed in 1920
Boise, Idaho
District heating in the United States
Hospital buildings on the National Register of Historic Places
Residential buildings on the National Register of Historic Places in Idaho
1920 establishments in Idaho
Former laundry buildings